A megakaryoblast is a precursor cell to a promegakaryocyte, which in turn becomes a megakaryocyte during haematopoiesis. It is the beginning of the thrombocytic series.

Development
The megakaryoblast derives from a CFU-Meg colony unit of pluripotential hemopoietic stem cells. (Some sources use the term "CFU-Meg" to identify the CFU.) The CFU-Meg derives from the CFU-GEMM (common myeloid progenitor).

Structure
These cells tend to range from 8μm to 30μm, owing to the variation in size between different megakaryoblasts. The nucleus is three to five times the size of the cytoplasm, and is generally round or oval in shape. Several nucleoli are visible, while the chromatin varies from cell to cell, ranging from fine to heavy and dense. The cytoplasm is generally basophilic and stains blue. In smaller cells, it contains no granules, but larger megakaryoblasts may contain fine granules.

References

External links
 Photo
 Photo
 Photo
 Life cycle

Leukocytes

de:Thrombopoese#Megakaryoblast